Sohini Ray (born 25 August 1966) is a classical Manipuri dancer  dance-researcher and anthropologist from India currently based in Los Angeles, United States.

Early career
Ray studied Manipuri dance from age seven in Manipuri Nartanalaya, Kolkata under Guru Bipin Singh, Darshana Jhaveri and Kalavati Devi. She went through her initiation ceremony with Guru Bipin Singh at age eleven and started performing professionally at fourteen. She was also Guru Bipin Singh's research assistant from age fourteen and received the national scholarship in Manipuri dance from the ministry of culture, Government of India in 1982. Concurrently she did her schooling from Modern High School for girls, Kolkata, where she also performed in school functions.

Academic career
Ray did her B.Sc. and M.Sc. degrees in anthropology from University of Calcutta. Later, she received her MA in dance and Ph.D. in anthropology from University California at Los Angeles. (Sanamahism). She was a fellow at the Center for the Study of World Religions, Harvard Divinity School and faculty fellow in University of California, Humanities Research Institute, University of California, Irvine. She has taught in University of California, Irvine, University of California, Santa Barbara  and Santa Monica College and has many publications.

Dance career
Sohini Ray is the founder and artistic director of Manipuri Dance Visions – Institute of Manipuri Dance in southern California. She has performed, choreographed and directed many productions in classical Manipuri dance namely Harao-kummei: joyful celebrations in Manipuri dance, Gita-Govinda, Krishna-Ningshingba and has performed and toured Europe and North America and India,

Academic awards and achievements
Jubilee prize, University of Calcutta, India, 1988
National Scholarship, University of Calcutta, India, 1988
University gold medal, University of Calcutta, India, 2011.
JB Donne Prize in anthropology of art, Royal Anthropological Institute, 2009.

Dance awards and achievements
National scholarship from government of India from 1982-1986,
First prize in Manipuri dance, Sangeetotsav, 1988
Shringar-Mani award, Kal-ke-kalakaar Sangeet Sammelan, Mumbai, 1988
Naratan Acharya, Manipuri Nartanalaya, Kolkata, 1999.
Elaine Weissman Los Angeles Treasures Award, California Traditional Music Society, 2007 
Nomination, Lestor Horton Award, 2007
Winner, Lestor Horton Award, 2008 
Nomination, Lestor Horton award, 2010.

References

1966 births
Indian anthropologists
University of Calcutta alumni
University of California, Los Angeles alumni
Living people
Manipuri classical Indian dance exponents
Indian women social scientists
Indian women anthropologists
Scientists from Kolkata
Indian female classical dancers
Performers of Indian classical dance
20th-century Indian dancers
20th-century Indian social scientists
Women scientists from West Bengal
20th-century Indian women scientists
21st-century Indian social scientists
21st-century Indian women scientists
Women educators from West Bengal